"Scotty Doesn't Know" is a song written and performed by the American rock band Lustra. Originally written for the 2004 film EuroTrip, the song contains numerous lewd and humorous references to how Scotty's girlfriend, Fiona, has been cheating on him with other partners for an extended period of time. Ironically, despite Fiona's seemingly obvious affairs, Scotty remains oblivious. Lyrically the song is inspired by the real-life story of the band's high school friend Sheridon, whose middle name was Scotty and is written from the perspective of the person with whom she is having the affair. The song was eventually released on Lustra's 2006 album Left for Dead. The song peaked at #53 on the U.S. Billboard Pop chart, #39 on the Digital Songs chart and at #75 on the Hot 100, mainly due to the high amount of digital downloads.

In 2018, the song received widespread attention in Australia after featuring in the hijacking of the official website of Scott Morrison, the country's Prime Minister at the time.

EuroTrip
In the film EuroTrip, Scotty (Scott Mechlowicz) is dumped by his girlfriend Fiona (Kristin Kreuk) for a band's lead singer (Matt Damon). The band performs the song at a party Scotty is attending and the song is praised by many characters in the film (including Scotty's parents and eventually Scotty himself) as being "catchy". The song becomes something of a popular phenomenon, appearing on the radio and across the world; in Bratislava, the song has been remixed and is playing in a popular nightclub. By the end of the film, it has become so widespread and popular that Scotty's best friend Cooper is able to use it as his cell phone ring tone.

Writing
EuroTrip film director Jeff Schaffer described "Scotty Doesn't Know" as "what’s the most embarrassing thing you could do that could happen to you after graduation?". Film writer David Mandel, members of Lustra, and Damon attended Harvard College together. The producers chose Lustra's version over another song written by Matt Mahaffey of Self, in which "Scotty Doesn't Know" also repeats in the chorus.

Legacy
While EuroTrip was not successful in theaters, it did well on home video and became a cult classic. In 2006 "Scotty Doesn't Know" hit the Billboard Hot 100, making Lustra among the first unsigned bands, other than Lisa Loeb, to appear on a record chart.

On October 18, 2018, the Prime Minister of Australia, Scott Morrison, had his personal website taken over as a prank after his ownership of it was apparently allowed to lapse. Instead of displaying information about the Prime Minister and his policies, the page displayed an image of Morrison with the song "Scotty Doesn't Know" playing on repeat.

The man behind the website claimed to have paid  for the domain name.

Chart positions

Certifications

References

2003 songs
2006 singles
Lustra (band) songs
Internet memes introduced in 2018
Political Internet memes
Practical jokes
Scott Morrison
Songs about fictional male characters
Songs about infidelity
Songs written for films